The Secretary of State for Energy is a senior official within the Ministry for the Ecological Transition of the Government of Spain. The Secretary of State is appointed by the Monarch after being nominated by the Council of Ministers with the advice of the Minister for the Ecological Transition.

The Secretary of State for Energy is the minister responsible for the development of the Government's energy and mining policy, to ensure the energy supply as well as the imposition and regulation of energy tariffs, taxes and prices, the processing of carbon subsidies in accordance with European Union regulations, the economic and financial analysis and monitoring of energy markets and the regulation, monitoring and analysis of gas and electricity auctions.

It is also responsible for the realization of statistics and analysis on the energy sector and the monitoring of the conjunctural and sectoral energy indicators, the settlement of the costs and revenues of the energy sectors, the inspection of compliance with the technical conditions of the facilities and energy authorizations that are the responsibility of the General State Administration, the certification of consumption and sale of biofuels, the supervision of the liquid hydrocarbon market, the exercise of powers of control, inspection and sanction in energy matters and monitoring of the international litigation related to the regulation of the energy sector. Most of this competencies are exercised in coordination with the National Commission on Markets and Competition (CNMC).

The Secretariat of State is structured in a unique department, the Directorate-General for Energy Policy and Mines.

History
The energy policy in Spain has been traditionally bound to the industrial policy and started taking more importance in 1979, when the Ministry of Industry was modified and named Ministry of Industry and Energy.

However, it wasn't until 1996 that the energy was granted with its own higher body, the Secretariat of State for Energy and Minieral Resources, assuming the competences of the General Secretariat for Energy and Mineral Resources. The life of this body was very short, being integrated in the Secretariat of State for Industry between 1998 and 2000 and in the Secretariat of State for Economy between 2000 and 2002, both bodies within the Ministry of Economy. In 2002, the competences over economy and over Energy and SMEs split in two Secretariats of State recovering its autonomy for 2 years until the change of government of 2004, when the new prime minister relegated the body to a General Secretariat level within the Ministry of Industry, Tourism and Trade. In 2009 was re-created.

The zenith of its autonomy reached it in 2016 when the prime minister split the Ministry of Industry originating a new Ministry of Energy that assumed also the competences over Tourism and Telecommunications.

In 2018, the new government modification integrated the Secretariat of State in the Ministry of Environment in order to establish a transversal environmental policy. This new ministry integrated all the environmental-related competences (except for industrial ones) and received the name of Ministry for the Ecological Transition.

Names
 Secretary of State for Energy and Mineral Resources (1996-1998)
 Secretary of State for Industry and Energy (1998-2000)
 Secretary of State for Economy, Energy and SMEs (2000-2002)
 Secretary of State for Energy, Industrial Development and SMEs (2002-2004)
 From 2004 and 2009, the competences were assumed by the General Secretary for Energy
 Secretary of State for Energy (2009-present)

Structure
The current organization of the Secretariat of State  is:
 The Directorate-General for Energy Policy and Mines.
It is the management body of the competencies of the Secretariat of State. It is divided in seven departments: The Deputy Directorate-General for Hydrocarbons, the Deputy Directorate-General for Electric Power, the Deputy Directorate-General for Nuclear Energy, the Deputy Directorate-General for Mines, the Deputy Directorate-General for Renewable Energies and Studies, the Deputy Directorate-General for Energy Efficiency and the Deputy Directorate-General for Energy Inspections and Liquidations and of Analysis, Planning and Prospective.

The Secretary of State has its own Cabinet composed of four advisors.

From Secretary of State directly depend several public bodies and enterprises such as the Institute for the Restructuring of Coal Mining and Alternative Development of the Mining Regions (IRMC), the Institute for the Diversification and Saving of Energy (IDAE), the City of Energy Foundation (CIUDEN) and the National Energy Efficiency Fund (FNEE). In addition, the state-owned enterprises National Company of Radioactive Waste (ENRESA) and Strategic Reserves of Petroleum Products Corporation (CORES) are under the tutelage of the Secretariat of State.

List of Secretaries

References

Secretaries of State of Spain
Energy in Spain
Mines in Spain